The 2019 UEFA Women's Under-19 Championship qualifying competition was a women's under-19 football competition that determined the seven teams joining the automatically qualified hosts Scotland in the 2019 UEFA Women's Under-19 Championship final tournament.

Apart from Scotland, 50 of the remaining 54 UEFA member national teams entered the qualifying competition. Players born on or after 1 January 2000 were eligible to participate. Starting from this season, up to five substitutions are permitted per team in each match.

Format
The qualifying competition consisted of two rounds:
Qualifying round: Apart from Spain and France, which received byes to the elite round as the teams with the highest seeding coefficient, the remaining 48 teams were drawn into 12 groups of four teams. Each group played a single round-robin, with one of the teams selected as hosts after the draw. The 12 group winners, the 12 runners-up, and the two third-placed teams with the best record against the first and second-placed teams in their group advanced to the elite round.
Elite round: 28 teams were drawn into seven groups of four teams. Each group played a single round-robin, with one of the teams selected as hosts after the draw. The seven group winners qualified for the final tournament.

Tiebreakers
For the qualifying round and elite round, teams were ranked according to points (3 points for a win, 1 point for a draw, 0 points for a loss), and if tied on points, the following tiebreaking criteria were to be applied, in the order given, to determine the rankings (Regulations Articles 14.01 and 14.02):
Points in head-to-head matches among tied teams;
Goal difference in head-to-head matches among tied teams;
Goals scored in head-to-head matches among tied teams;
If more than two teams were tied, and after applying all head-to-head criteria above, a subset of teams were still tied, all head-to-head criteria above were reapplied exclusively to this subset of teams;
Goal difference in all group matches;
Goals scored in all group matches;
Penalty shoot-out if only two teams had the same number of points, and they met in the last round of the group and were tied after applying all criteria above (not used if more than two teams had the same number of points, or if their rankings were not relevant for qualification for the next stage);
Disciplinary points (red card = 3 points, yellow card = 1 point, expulsion for two yellow cards in one match = 3 points);
UEFA coefficient for the qualifying round draw;
Drawing of lots.

To determine the two best third-placed teams from the qualifying round, the results against the teams in fourth place were discarded. The following criteria were applied (Regulations Article 15.01):
Points;
Goal difference;
Goals scored;
Disciplinary points;
UEFA coefficient for the qualifying round draw;
Drawing of lots.

Qualifying round

Draw
The draw for the qualifying round was held on 24 November 2017, 10:00 CET (UTC+1), at the UEFA headquarters in Nyon, Switzerland.

The teams were seeded according to their coefficient ranking, calculated based on the following (a four-year window was used instead of the previous three-year window):
2014 UEFA Women's Under-19 Championship final tournament and qualifying competition (qualifying round and elite round)
2015 UEFA Women's Under-19 Championship final tournament and qualifying competition (qualifying round and elite round)
2016 UEFA Women's Under-19 Championship final tournament and qualifying competition (qualifying round and elite round)
2017 UEFA Women's Under-19 Championship final tournament and qualifying competition (qualifying round and elite round)

Each group contained one team from Pot A, one team from Pot B, one team from Pot C, and one team from Pot D. For political reasons, Russia and Ukraine, Armenia and Azerbaijan, Serbia and Kosovo, and Bosnia and Herzegovina and Kosovo would not be drawn in the same group.

Notes
Teams marked in bold have qualified for the final tournament.

Groups
The qualifying round must be played by 28 October 2018, and on the following FIFA International Match Calendar dates unless all four teams agree to play on another date:
27 August – 4 September 2018
1–9 October 2018

Times are CEST (UTC+2), as listed by UEFA (local times, if different, are in parentheses).

Group 1

Group 2

Group 3

Group 4

Group 5

Group 6

Group 7

Group 8

Group 9

Group 10

Group 11

Group 12

Ranking of third-placed teams
To determine the two best third-placed teams from the qualifying round which advance to the elite round, only the results of the third-placed teams against the first and second-placed teams in their group are taken into account.

Elite round

Draw
The draw for the elite round was held on 23 November 2018, 11:00 CET (UTC+1), at the UEFA headquarters in Nyon, Switzerland.

The teams were seeded according to their results in the qualifying round. Spain and France, which received byes to the elite round, were automatically seeded into Pot A. Each group contained one team from Pot A, one team from Pot B, one team from Pot C, and one team from Pot D. Winners and runners-up from the same qualifying round group could not be drawn in the same group, but the best third-placed teams could be drawn in the same group as winners or runners-up from the same qualifying round group.

Groups
The elite round is scheduled to be played on the following FIFA International Match Calendar dates unless all four teams agree to play on another date:
1–9 April 2019
10–18 June 2019

Times are CEST (UTC+2), as listed by UEFA (local times, if different, are in parentheses).

Group 1

Group 2

Group 3

Group 4

Group 5

Group 6

Group 7

Qualified teams
The following eight teams qualify for the final tournament.

1 Bold indicates champions for that year. Italic indicates hosts for that year.

Goalscorers
In the qualifying round 
In the elite round 
In total

References

External links

Qualification
2019
2018 in women's association football
2019 in women's association football
2018 in youth association football
2019 in youth association football
August 2018 sports events in Europe
September 2018 sports events in Europe
October 2018 sports events in Europe
April 2019 sports events in Europe